British Westpoint Airlines was a British charter and scheduled airline from 1962 to 1967.

History 
The airline started operations in March 1961 operating charters and summer pleasure flights from a base established at Exeter Airport using a fleet of de Havilland Dragon Rapides. In 1961 the first two of three former British European Airways Douglas DC-3s were acquired and a scheduled service was started linking Exeter with Newquay Airport and London Heathrow Airport.

In 1964 further Dragon Rapides along with Mayflower Air Services were acquired in 1964. During 1966 the airline looked at the feasibility of re-equipping with larger aircraft and expanding the network further, but financial problems caused the cessation of flying in May 1966.

Fleet
 de Havilland Dove
 de Havilland Dragon Rapide
 de Havilland Heron
 Douglas DC-3

See also
 List of defunct airlines of the United Kingdom

References 

 

Defunct airlines of the United Kingdom
Airlines established in 1962
Airlines disestablished in 1967
British companies established in 1962